Massimo Pedrazzini (born 3 February 1958) is an Italian football coach and former player.

Career

Player 
A former midfielder who mostly played with Serie B and Serie C1 clubs, he won a total of four promotions in his playing career, with Triestina, Catanzaro (both to Serie B), Mantova (promotion to Serie C1) and Fiorenzuola (promotion to Serie C2).

Coach 
He then became a football coach, working from 1991 to 1996 within AC Milan's youth system. In 2002–03, he enjoyed his first head coaching experience at the helm of Serie C2's Monza, and later joined Walter Zenga's coaching staff, serving as his assistant with Steaua București, Red Star Belgrade, Gaziantepspor and Al Ain FC. In September 2007 he was appointed as interim head coach following Gheorghe Hagi's resignations. He was successively dismissed on late October and replaced by Marius Lăcătuş, but accepted to stay at Steaua as assistant coach. He then served as caretaker manager for the final three games of the 2008–09 season, after Marius Lăcătuş stepped down as Steaua boss in May 2009.

In June 2009 he agreed to return working alongside Walter Zenga, becoming assistant coach of Sicilian Serie A club Palermo, which he left later in November after Zenga was dismissed.

Honours

Player
US Triestina Calcio
Serie C1: 1982–83
US Catanzaro
Serie C1: 1984–85
AC Mantova
Serie C2: 1987–88
US Fiorenzuola
Serie D: 1989–90

Manager
Steaua București
Romanian Supercup: Runner-up 2015

References

Sources

 

Living people
1958 births
Footballers from Milan
Italian footballers
Italy youth international footballers
Italian football managers
A.C. Milan players
Ternana Calcio players
A.S. Sambenedettese players
U.S. Triestina Calcio 1918 players
A.C.R. Messina players
U.S. Catanzaro 1929 players
U.S. Salernitana 1919 players
Mantova 1911 players
U.S. Fiorenzuola 1922 S.S. players
Serie B players
A.C. Milan non-playing staff
Inter Milan non-playing staff
Hellas Verona F.C. non-playing staff
Red Star Belgrade non-playing staff
Gaziantepspor non-playing staff
A.C. Monza managers
FC Steaua București managers
FC Steaua București assistant managers
S.S.D. Pro Sesto managers
Association football midfielders